LTR Standard and Passport systems are hybrid Trunked Radio Systems that have some LTR Standard talkgroups and some LTR Passport talkgroups.

Logic Trunked Radio